Pentecost is an oil on canvas painting by Moretto da Brescia, executed c. 1543–1544, originally painted for San Giuseppe Church in Brescia and now in the city's Pinacoteca Tosio Martinengo.

References

Paintings in the collection of the Pinacoteca Tosio Martinengo
1544 paintings
Moretto
Paintings by Moretto da Brescia